Juntunen is a Finnish surname. Notable people with the surname include:

 Paul Juntunen (also known as Paul Jayson; 1921–2004), American professional basketball player
 Craig Juntunen (born 1954), American player of Canadian football
 Jani Juntunen, Finnish radio host
Helena Juntunen (born 1976), Finnish opera singer
 Tommi Juntunen (born 1993), Swedish ice hockey player

Finnish-language surnames